Vivalyn Latty-Scott (1939 – 9 January 2021) was a Jamaican cricketer who played as an all-rounder, batting right-handed and bowling right-arm off break. She appeared in five One Day Internationals for Jamaica at the 1973 World Cup, and ten Test matches and one One Day International for the West Indies between 1976 and 1979. She also played domestic cricket for Jamaica.

Career 
She was hailed as the pioneer of women's cricket in the West Indies and was part of West Indies women team for their inaugural women's Test match against Australia in 1976. 

During that Test match, she claimed five wickets for the concession of 48 runs in the second innings, becoming the first and only West Indian woman to take a five-wicket haul in Tests. She is also one of thirteen women cricketers to have taken a five-wicket haul on their Test debut.

After her retirement from professional cricket, she pursued her career in coaching and umpiring.

Death
She died on 9 January 2021 at the age of 82 in West Palm Beach Florida, USA.

References

External links
 
 

1939 births
2021 deaths
West Indian women cricketers
West Indies women Test cricketers
West Indies women One Day International cricketers
Jamaican women cricketers
People from Clarendon Parish, Jamaica